Cibes Lift Group AB (often shorted to Cibes Lift) is a Swedish manufacturer of low speed, screw-driven platform lifts for installation in public and private environments. Based in the Swedish city of Gävle, Cibes Lift claims to be one of the largest manufacturers for low-speed lifts with sales and distribution available in 50 countries.

History
During the 1950s, a manufacturing was started in Solna (Sweden) by chain-driven hoists with lift car for rated loads between 200 and 1000 kg. Manufacturing and sales amounted to approx. 30 lifts / year under the brand name Elektroborg. 
MSc Bertil Svedberg founded the company Cibes in 1947, took over the business Elektroborg during the 1950s.
Stenfors Industries in Skillingaryd, Sweden, contract manufactured in the mid-1960s, a housing adapted lift for disabled, the product consisted of a lift table with guardrails, Cibes handled the sales activities of the lift during the 1970s, developed the product and made it accessible for the use of wheelchairs. This lift was a pioneering product in the disability field, with a design where the car was driven with a screw rod, built on a tripod with legs. This wheelchair lift had a design with inbuilt safety aspects as early as the late 1970s, and was recommended in buildings by the Swedish Work Environment Authority.

Thanks to Swedish social reforms and legislation, to increase the integration of disabled people in society, the sales increased throughout the 1980s.
1986 Cibes started to manufactured and product developed the platform lifts in Järbo, Sweden.
The export began in 1989, first to the Nordic countries, Finland and 1990 to Norway.
1991 Cibes Elevator AB (now Cibes Lift AB) was formed with sales and marketing.1992 Cibes Elevator AB moved to new and more suitable premises to meet the expected expansion.
1996 Sweden joined the European Community (EC). The platform lift A5000 was certified for the EC market, exports began on a broad field and the company expanded rapidly.

1999 Cibes was one of the 24 European companies that founded the association European Platform and Stairlift Association (EPSA)

In 2012, the company's production facilities and headquarters were transferred from Järba to Gävle. Cibeles lifts have been sold to about 50 countries.

References

External links 
 Official Website

Elevator manufacturers
Manufacturing companies established in 1947
1947 establishments in Sweden
Swedish brands